Giovanni Battista de Toni (2 January 1864, Venice – 31 July 1924, Modena) was an Italian botanist, mycologist and phycologist.

In 1885 he graduated from the University of Padua, where he studied natural sciences and chemistry with Pier Andrea Saccardo (1845-1920) and Francesco Filippuzzi (1824-1886). For several years, he worked as a librarian in the museum of Padua, afterwards teaching botany at the University of Camerino (1900). Following duties as a professor of botany in Sassari, he relocated to Modena, where from 1903, he served as a professor of botany and as associate director of the botanical garden. During his career, he took numerous scientific trips throughout Europe — travels where he met and studied with scientists that included Jacob Georg Agardh (1813-1901), Alfred Mathieu Giard (1846-1908), Louis Mangin (1852-1937) and Narcisse Théophile Patouillard (1854-1926).

His earlier work dealt mainly with plant systematics, his later research involved studies in the fields of phytophysiology and phytogeography. In 1889 he began work on "Sylloge algarum omnium hucusque cognitarum", a massive project that was an index of all known algae. In collaboration with Saccardo, he made important contributions to "Sylloge Fungorum hucusque cognitorum" (index of fungi). As a naturalist-historian, he published a work on Leonardo da Vinci, titled "Le piante e gli animali in Leonardo da Vinci" (The plants and animals in (the works of) Leonardo da Vinci).

From 1890, he was editor of the journal "La Nuova Notarisia", a quarterly magazine dedicated to the study of algae.

He was honoured in 1894, in the naming of Detonula, which is a genus of diatoms belonging to the family Thalassiosiraceae. He was also honoured 1934, in Johannesbaptistia is a genus of brackish–freshwater cyanobacteria.

References 

1864 births
1924 deaths
Scientists from Venice
19th-century Italian botanists
Italian mycologists
Phycologists
Academic staff of the University of Modena and Reggio Emilia
University of Padua alumni
20th-century Italian botanists